The 2022 Harlow District Council election took place on 5 May 2022 to elect members of Harlow District Council in Essex.  This was on the same day as other local elections.

Results summary

Ward results

Bush Fair

Church Langley

Great Parndon

Harlow Common

Little Parndon & Hare Street

Mark Hall

Netteswell

Old Harlow

Staple Tye

Sumners & Kingsmoor

Toddbrook

By-elections

Bush Fair

References

Harlow
2022
2020s in Essex